Bagnall is a civil parish in the district of Staffordshire Moorlands, Staffordshire, England. It contains 18 listed buildings that are recorded in the National Heritage List for England. All the listed buildings are designated at Grade II, the lowest of the three grades, which is applied to "buildings of national importance and special interest".  The parish contains the village of Bagnall and the surrounding area.  The Caldon Canal runs through the northwest part of the parish, and the listed buildings associated with it are a bridge, a lock, a lock keeper's cottage, and stables.  The other listed buildings are houses and associated structures, farmhouses, farm buildings, a church and items in the churchyard, a public house, a well house, a village cross, and a telephone kiosk.


Buildings

References

Citations

Sources

Lists of listed buildings in Staffordshire